Bethelsdorp is a town in Nelson Mandela Bay Metropolitan Municipality in the Eastern Cape province of South Africa, 20 km north-west of Port Elizabeth.

History
Established in 1803 by Rev. J.T. van der Kemp on the farm Roodepas of Theunis Botha as a mission station of the London Missionary Society. The name is derived from the Hebrew word Baitheel, meaning 'House of God'.

Under the previous political dispensation, Bethelsdorp was a township almost exclusively inhabited by coloureds (Afrikaans: Kleurlinge). This changed somewhat with the end of Apartheid in South Africa in 1994, as living and trading in the township is now freely open to all races.

References

Populated places in Nelson Mandela Bay
Former Coloured townships in South Africa
Populated places established in 1803